Copperfield is a 1981 musical with a book, music, and lyrics by Al Kasha and Joel Hirschhorn, who were nominated for the 1981 Tony Award for Best Original Score. It is based on the classic 1850 novel David Copperfield by Charles Dickens.

The Broadway production was directed and choreographed by Rob Iscove. It began previews at the ANTA Playhouse on March 25, opened on April 16, and closed on April 26 after 39 performances, including 26 previews.

Principal cast
Brian Matthews ..... Adult David
Evan Richards ..... Young David
Barrie Ingham ..... Uriah Heep
Beulah Garrick ..... Mrs. Heep
George S. Irving ..... Mr Micawber
Linda Poser ..... Mrs. Micawber
Mary Stout ..... Peggotty
Mary Elizabeth Mastrantonio ..... Dora Spenlow
Christian Slater ..... Billy Mowcher
Lenny Wolpe ..... Mr. Dick
Carmen Mathews ..... Aunt Betsey Trotwood
Pamela McLernon ..... Clara Copperfield
Brian Quinn ..... Mealy Potatoes
Maris Clement ..... Jane Murdstone
Gary Munch ..... Mick Walker

Principal production credits
Producers ..... Don Gregory, Mike Merrick, and Dome Productions
Musical Director ..... Larry Blank
Orchestrator ..... Irwin Kostal
Scenic Design ..... Tony Straiges
Costume Design ..... John David Ridge
Lighting Design ..... Ken Billington
Sound Design ..... John McClure

Song list

Act I
"I Don't Want a Boy" – Aunt Betsey Trotwood, Peggotty and Ensemble 
"Mama, Don't Get Married" – Young David, Clara Copperfield and Peggotty 
"Copperfield" – Young David, Mr. Quinion, Mealy Potatoes, Billy Mowcher, Mick Walker and Ensemble 
"Something Will Turn Up" – Mr. Micawber, Young David, Creditors and Ensemble 
"Anyone" – Young David 
"Here's a Book" – Aunt Betsey Trotwood, Mr. Dick and Young David 
"Here's a Book (Reprise)" – Betsey Trotwood, Mr. Dick and Adult David 
"Umble" – Uriah Heep and Mrs. Heep 
"The Circle Waltz" – Adult David, Dora Spenlow, Agnes Wickfield and Ensemble 

Act II
"Up the Ladder" – Uriah Heep and Mr. Micawber 
"I Wish He Knew" – Agnes Wickfield 
"The Lights of London" – Adult David, Dora Spenlow and Company 
"Umble (Reprise)" – Uriah Heep 
"Something Will Turn Up (Reprise)" – Mr. Micawber and Adult David 
"Villainy Is the Matter" – Adult David, Uriah Heep, Mr. Micawber, Agnes Wickfield, Aunt Betsey Trotwood, Mr. Dick, Mrs. Heep, Peggotty and Mrs. Micawber 
"With the One I Love" – Adult David 
"Something Will Turn Up (Reprise)" – Mr. Micawber and Ensemble 
"Anyone (Reprise)" – Adult David and Agnes Wickfield

Critical reception
In his review in The New York Times, Frank Rich said,

References

External links
 Copperfield at the Internet Broadway Database

1981 musicals
Broadway musicals
Musicals based on novels
Works based on David Copperfield
Musicals based on works by Charles Dickens